The gods (UK English), or sometimes paradise, is a theatrical term, referring to the highest areas of a theatre such as the upper balconies.  These are generally the cheapest seats.  One reason for naming the cheapest seats "the gods" is because the theatres have beautifully painted ceilings, often mythological themes, so the cheap seats are up near the gods. Another is that those seated in "the gods" look down upon both the performers and the occupants of more expensive seats, like the Olympian Gods looking down from Mount Olympus upon the lives of mortal people.

There are references to the "gods" in many plays and films.  Among them is the famous French film, Les Enfants du Paradis (or Children of Paradise in its US release), which is described as "set in the teeming theatre district of 1840s Paris (the "boulevard du crime"), the paradise of the film's title is a reference to "the gods", the highest, cheapest seats in the theatre, occupied by the poorest of the poor. As the well-known 1930s-and-later screenwriter Jacques Prévert said when asked about the meaning of the title, "it refers to the actors ... and the audiences too, the good-natured, working-class audience".

See also
 Bleachers
 Box (theatre)
 Nosebleed seats
 Peanut gallery

References

Theatre